Alexis Rubén González (born 21 July 1981) is an Argentine male volleyball player. He was part of the Argentina men's national volleyball team. He competed with the national team at the 2012 Summer Olympics in London, Great Britain. He played with Club Ciudad de Bolívar in 2012.

Clubs
  Club Ciudad de Bolívar (2012)

See also
 Argentina at the 2012 Summer Olympics

References

External links 
  (archive)
 
 
 

1981 births
Living people
Argentine men's volleyball players
Volleyball players from Buenos Aires
Olympic volleyball players of Argentina
Volleyball players at the 2012 Summer Olympics
Volleyball players at the 2016 Summer Olympics
21st-century Argentine people